Clara Gutsche (born April 20, 1949) is an American-born Canadian photographer, educator and art critic living and working in Montreal.

She was born in St. Louis, Missouri. She studied visual arts at Concordia University and obtained a MA in photography. She teaches photography part-time in the Studio Arts department at Concordia.

She was a founding member of the artist-run Powerhouse Gallery (now La Centrale galerie Powerhouse) in Montreal.

Work

Gutsche's work portrays the relation between people and their environments. Her series La série des couvents ("The Convent Series") shows nuns in various convents in Quebec.

Her work is held in public collections, including the Canadian Museum of Contemporary Photography, the Canadian Centre for Architecture, the Musée national des beaux-arts du Québec and Library and Archives Canada.

Photography series

Milton Park, 1970 - 1973
Six Sisters / Les six soeurs, 1974 - 1976
Inner Landscapes / Les paysages vitrés, 1976 - 1980
Parkscapes / Les paysages domestiques, 1982 - 1984
Sarah, 1982 - 1989
The Lachine Canal / Le canal de Lachine, 1985 - 1990
Convents / Couvents, 1990 - 1998
High School Series / Les collèges, 1993 - 1998
The Bedroom Series / La série des chambres, 1999 - 2001
Windows / Les vitrines, 2000 - 2002
Inhabited Landscapes / Les paysages habités, 2004 - 2005

References

External links 
 

1949 births
Living people
Canadian women photographers
Concordia University alumni
Academic staff of Concordia University